1,4-Benzoquinone, commonly known as para-quinone, is a chemical compound with the formula C6H4O2. In a pure state, it forms bright-yellow crystals with a characteristic irritating odor, resembling that of chlorine, bleach, and hot plastic or formaldehyde. This six-membered ring compound is the oxidized derivative of 1,4-hydroquinone. The molecule is multifunctional: it exhibits properties of a ketone, being able to form oximes; an oxidant, forming the dihydroxy derivative; and an alkene, undergoing addition reactions, especially those typical for α,β-unsaturated ketones. 1,4-Benzoquinone is sensitive toward both strong mineral acids and alkali, which cause condensation and decomposition of the compound.

Preparation
1,4-Benzoquinone is prepared industrially by oxidation of hydroquinone, which can be obtained by several routes. One route involves oxidation of diisopropylbenzene and the Hock rearrangement.  The net reaction can be represented as follows:
C6H4(CHMe2)2  +  3 O2   →   C6H4O2  +  2 OCMe2  +  H2O
The reaction proceeds via the bis(hydroperoxide) and the hydroquinone.  Acetone is a coproduct.

Another major process involves the direct hydroxylation of phenol by acidic hydrogen peroxide:
C6H5OH  +  H2O2   →   C6H4(OH)2  +  H2O
Both hydroquinone and catechol are produced.  Subsequent oxidation of the hydroquinone gives the quinone.

Quinone was originally prepared industrially by oxidation of aniline, for example by manganese dioxide. This method is mainly practiced in PRC where environmental regulations are more relaxed.

Oxidation of hydroquinone is facile. One such method makes use of hydrogen peroxide as the oxidizer and iodine or an iodine salt as a catalyst for the oxidation occurring in a polar solvent; e.g. isopropyl alcohol.

When heated to near its melting point, 1,4-benzoquinone sublimes, even at atmospheric pressure, allowing for an effective purification. Impure samples are often dark-colored due to the presence of quinhydrone, a dark green 1:1 charge-transfer complex of quinone with hydroquinone.

Structure and redox

Benzoquinone is a planar molecule with localized, alternating C=C, C=O, and C–C bonds. Reduction gives the semiquinone anion C6H4O2−}, which adopts a more delocalized structure. Further reduction coupled to protonation gives the hydroquinone, wherein the C6 ring is fully delocalized.

Reactions and applications
Quinone is mainly used as a precursor to hydroquinone, which is used in photography and rubber manufacture as a reducing agent and antioxidant. Benzoquinonium is a skeletal muscle relaxant, ganglion blocking agent that is made from benzoquinone.

Organic synthesis
It is used as a hydrogen acceptor and oxidant in organic synthesis. 1,4-Benzoquinone serves as a dehydrogenation reagent. It is also used as a dienophile in Diels Alder reactions.

Benzoquinone reacts with acetic anhydride and sulfuric acid to give the triacetate of hydroxyquinol. This reaction is called the Thiele reaction or Thiele–Winter reaction after Johannes Thiele, who first described it in 1898, and after Ernst Winter, who further described its reaction mechanism in 1900. An application is found in this step of the total synthesis of Metachromin A:

Benzoquinone is also used to suppress double-bond migration during olefin metathesis reactions.

An acidic potassium iodide solution reduces a solution of benzoquinone to hydroquinone, which can be reoxidized back to the quinone with a solution of silver nitrate.

Due to its ability to function as an oxidizer, 1,4-benzoquinone can be found in methods using the Wacker-Tsuji oxidation, wherein a palladium salt catalyzes the conversion of an alkene to a ketone. This reaction is typically carried out using pressurized oxygen as the oxidizer, but benzoquinone can sometimes preferred. It is also used as a reagent in some variants on Wacker oxidations.

1,4-Benzoquinone is used in the synthesis of Bromadol and related analogs.

Related 1,4-benzoquinones

2,3-Dichloro-5,6-dicyano-1,4-benzoquinone (DDQ) is a stronger oxidant and dehydrogenation agent than 1,4-benzoquinone. Chloranil 1,4-C6Cl4O2 is another potent oxidant and dehydrogenation agent. Monochloro-p-benzoquinone is yet another but milder oxidant.

Metabolism
1,4-Benzoquinone is a toxic metabolite found in human blood and can be used to track exposure to benzene or mixtures containing benzene and benzene compounds, such as petrol. The compound can interfere with cellular respiration, and kidney damage has been found in animals receiving severe exposure. It is excreted in its original form and also as variations of its own metabolite, hydroquinone.

Safety

1,4-Benzoquinone is able to stain skin dark brown, cause erythema (redness, rashes on skin) and lead on to localized tissue necrosis. It is particularly irritating to the eyes and respiratory system. Its ability to sublime at commonly encountered temperatures allows for a greater airborne exposure risk than might be expected for a room-temperature solid. IARC has found insufficient evidence to comment on the compound's carcinogenicity, but has noted that it can easily pass into the bloodstream and that it showed activity in depressing bone marrow production in mice and can inhibit protease enzymes involved in cellular apoptosis.

See also
Tetrahydroxybenzoquinone
Benzoquinonetetracarboxylic acid
1,2-Benzoquinone
Quinones
Duroquinone
Ardisiaquinone

References

 
Oxidizing agents
Enones

ja:ベンゾキノン#1,4-ベンゾキノン